Tritium is a radioactive isotope of hydrogen.

Tritium may also refer to:

 Tritium Calcio 1908, an Italian association football club
 Tritium (programming language), a scripting language for transforming markup files
 Tritium (village), a Roman village in present-day Spain
 Tritium (company), an Australian electric vehicle charger manufacturer